Michelozzo (foaled 1986 in the United States) is a retired British Thoroughbred racehorse best known for winning the 1989 Classic St. Leger Stakes (run that year at Ayr because the Doncaster course was deemed unsafe due to subsidence) under jockey Steve Cauthen. Raced by Charles A. B. St-George, who had owned the great Ardross, Michelozzo was trained by Henry Cecil.

References
 Michelozzo's pedigree and partial racing stats

1986 racehorse births
Racehorses bred in the United States
Racehorses trained in the United Kingdom
Thoroughbred family 8-c
St Leger winners